Richard Podesta (born 1 March 1948) is a French racing cyclist. He rode in the 1973 Tour de France.

References

External links
 

1948 births
Living people
French male cyclists
Place of birth missing (living people)